Environmental stewardship refers to the responsible use and protection of the natural environment through active participation in conservation efforts and sustainable practices by individuals, small groups, nonprofit organizations, federal agencies, and other collective networks. Aldo Leopold (1887–1949) championed environmental stewardship in land ethics, exploring the ethical implications of "dealing with man's relationship to land and to the animals and plants which grow upon it."

Resilience-based ecosystem stewardship
Resilience-based ecosystem stewardship emphasizes resilience as an integral feature of responding and interacting with the environment in a constantly changing world. Resilience refers to the ability of a system to recover from disturbance and return to its basic function and structure. For example, ecosystems do not serve as singular resources, but rather are function-dependent in providing an array of ecosystem services. Additionally, this type of stewardship recognizes resource managers and management systems as influential and informed participants in the natural systems that are serviced by humans.

Roles of environmental stewards

Environmental stewards have three roles: doers, donors, and practitioners.

Doers are people who are active in environmental aid and work hands-on in cases, (such as volunteering to clean up oil after an oil spill). Donors contribute to a cause financially, which is commonly done through fundraising or personal donation. Benefactors typically come from government agencies. Practitioners are stewards that work on a day-to-day basis in the political field of environmental stewardship, acting as advocates in collaboration with various environmental agencies and groups. All three types of stewards aim to promote environmental literacy and encourage conservation movements.

With a biocultural conservation perspective, Ricardo Rozzi and collaborators have proposed participatory intercultural approaches to earth stewardship, focused on the potential that long-term socio-ecological research (LTSER) sites have to coordinate heterogeneous local initiatives with global networking, and implementation of culturally diverse forms of earth stewardship.

Examples of environmental stewardship 
Many programs, partnerships, and funding initiatives have tried to implement environmental stewardship into the workings of society. Pesticide Environmental Stewardship Program (PESP), a partnership program overseen by the US Environmental Protection Agency, provides pesticide-user consultation to reduce the use of hazardous chemicals and identify the detrimental impact these chemicals can have on social and environmental health.

In 2006, England placed environmental stewardship at the center of an agricultural incentives mechanism, encouraging cattle farmers to better manage their land, crops, animals and material use. The Environmental Stewardship Award was created as part of this initiative to highlight members whose actions exemplify alignment with environmental stewardship.

Social science implications 
Studies have explored the benefits of environmental stewardship in various contexts such as the evaluation, modeling and integration into policy, system management and urban planning. One such study has examined how social attributes of environmental stewardship can be used to reconfigure local conservation efforts. Social ties to environmental stewardship are displayed by the NRPA's efforts to place environmental stewardship at the forefront of childhood development and youths' consciousness of the outdoors. Similarly, practicing environmental stewardship has been suggested as effective mental health treatments and natural therapies.

See also
Ecotheology
Eco hotel
Environmental personhood
Environmental protection
Environmental stewardship (England)
Evangelical environmentalism
Stewardship
Stewardship (theology)

References

Environmental conservation
Stewardship
Sustainability and environmental management
Environmental protection
Natural resources